Theodoros Papoutsogiannopoulos (born 5 July 1994) is a Greek professional footballer who plays as a right back for Super League 2 club Egaleo.

Career
Papoutsogiannopoulos started playing professional football with Atromitos, after his promotion for the first team from the Youth system. He made his debut in Greek Super League for Atromitos against Olympiacos.

In June 2017, he joined Bulgarian First League club Slavia Sofia but his contract was terminated by mutual consent in September.

On 1 September 2017, Papoutsogiannopoulos joined Kalamata.

Honours
Olympiacos Volos
Gamma Ethniki: 2018–19

References

External links
 

1994 births
Living people
Greece youth international footballers
Greece under-21 international footballers
Atromitos F.C. players
Niki Volos F.C. players
AO Chania F.C. players
Pierikos F.C. players
PFC Slavia Sofia players
Kalamata F.C. players
Olympiacos Volos F.C. players
Association football fullbacks
Super League Greece players
First Professional Football League (Bulgaria) players
Greek expatriate footballers
Greek expatriate sportspeople in Bulgaria
Expatriate footballers in Bulgaria
Footballers from Athens
Greek footballers